Section 60 may refer to:
The section of Arlington National Cemetery for veterans of the wars in Afghanistan and Iraq.
Section 60: Arlington National Cemetery, a documentary by Jon Alpert about the families of veterans buried in Section 60
The section relating to 'stop and search' powers of the British police in the Criminal Justice and Public Order Act 1994